Foster Child may refer to:
 Foster child
 Foster Child (1987 film), a documentary film by Gil Cardinal
 Foster Child (2007 film), a Filipino indie pregnancy drama film